This is a list of Croatian composers.

References

Croatian
Composers